Sjeng Schalken was the defending champion and won in the final 6–3, 6–4 against Arnaud Clément.

Seeds
A champion seed is indicated in bold text while text in italics indicates the round in which that seed was eliminated.

  Jiří Novák (quarterfinals)
  Paradorn Srichaphan (second round)
  Sjeng Schalken (champion)
  Martin Verkerk (first round)
  Sébastien Grosjean (second round)
  Tommy Robredo (quarterfinals)
  Arnaud Clément (final)
  José Acasuso (first round)

Draw

External links
 2003 Ordina Open Draw

Men's Singles
Singles